The Athens County Infirmary is a registered historic district near Chauncey, Ohio, listed in the National Register on 2003-05-01.  It contains five contributing buildings. The property is commonly known locally as the County Farm or the County Home. It currently houses the county's recycling center, dog shelter, and offices of Job & Family Services.  There is also an historic cemetery on the property. The Burr Oak Water District recently has established a wellfield in the riparian zone, in deep unconsolidated sediments along the Hocking River for their primary water source, because their former water source, Burr Oak Lake, is polluted with unacceptable contaminants.

Historic uses 
Secondary Structure
Institutional Housing
Agricultural Outbuildings

References 

Government buildings on the National Register of Historic Places in Ohio
Historic districts on the National Register of Historic Places in Ohio
Buildings and structures in Athens County, Ohio
National Register of Historic Places in Athens County, Ohio